The 1976 Norwegian Football Cup was the 71st edition of the Norwegian annual knockout football tournament. The Cup was won by Brann after beating Sogndal in the cup final with the score 2–1. This was Brann's fourth Norwegian Cup title.

Sogndal played in the third division at this time.

First round

|-
|colspan="3" style="background-color:#97DEFF"|Replay

|}

Second round

|-
|colspan="3" style="background-color:#97DEFF"|Replay

|}

Third round

|colspan="3" style="background-color:#97DEFF"|25 July 1976

|-
|colspan="3" style="background-color:#97DEFF"|28 July 1976

|-
|colspan="3" style="background-color:#97DEFF"|29 July 1976

|-
|colspan="3" style="background-color:#97DEFF"|Replay: 29 July 1976

|-
|colspan="3" style="background-color:#97DEFF"|Replay: 4 August 1976

|}

Fourth round

|colspan="3" style="background-color:#97DEFF"|15 August 1976

|-
|colspan="3" style="background-color:#97DEFF"|18 August 1976

|}

Quarter-finals

|colspan="3" style="background-color:#97DEFF"|5 September 1976

|-
|colspan="3" style="background-color:#97DEFF"|Replay: 29 September 1976

|}

Semi-finals

|colspan="3" style="background-color:#97DEFF"|6 October 1976

|}

Final

Brann's winning squad: Jan Knudsen, Tore Nordtvedt, Helge Karlsen, Atle Bilsback, Per Egil Pedersen, Ingvald Huseklepp (Rune Pedersen 84), Atle Hellesø (Frode Larsen 46), Neil MacLeod, Egil Austbø, Steinar Aase and Bjørn Tronstad.

Sogndal's squad: Leon Hovland, Willy Ljøsne (Jarle Skartun 88), Jon Navarsete, Torodd Helle, Gunnar S. Haare, Magdalon Sæthre, Ingvar Stadheim, Johan Johannesen, Svein Bakke, Knut Christiansen and Rolf Navarsete (Terje Nysæther 89).

References
 www.brann.no

External links
http://www.rsssf.no

Norwegian Football Cup seasons
Norway
Football Cup